Gun Law Justice is a 1949 American Western film directed by Lambert Hillyer and written by Basil Dickey. The film stars Jimmy Wakely, Dub Taylor, Poni Adams, Lee Phelps, John James and I. Stanford Jolley. The film was released on March 13, 1949, by Monogram Pictures.

Plot

Cast          
Jimmy Wakely as Jimmy Wakely
Dub Taylor as Cannonball
Poni Adams as Jane Darnton
Lee Phelps as Hank Cardigan
John James as Tom Cardigan
I. Stanford Jolley as Duke Corliss
Myron Healey as Jensen
Edmund Cobb as Sheriff
Bob Woodward as Bob Davis
Bob Curtis as Slim Craig
Carol Henry as Bert

References

External links
 

1949 films
American Western (genre) films
1949 Western (genre) films
Monogram Pictures films
Films directed by Lambert Hillyer
American black-and-white films
1940s English-language films
1940s American films